Taninthayi Township is a township of Myeik District in the Taninthayi Division of Myanmar. The principal town is Taninthayi.

Demographics

2014 
The 2014 Myanmar Census reported that Myeik Township had a population of 106,853. The population density was 9.4 people per km2. The census reported that the median age was 21.9 years, and 105 males per 100 females. There were 54,349 households; the mean household size was 5.2.

References 

Townships of Taninthayi Region